Oreochromis is a large genus of oreochromine cichlids, fishes endemic to Africa and the Middle East. A few species from this genus have been introduced far outside their native range and are important in aquaculture. Many others have very small ranges; some are seriously threatened, and O. ismailiaensis and O. lidole possibly are extinct. Although Oreochromis primarily are freshwater fish of rivers, lakes and similar habitats, several species can also thrive in brackish waters and some even survive in hypersaline conditions with a salinity that far surpasses that of seawater. In addition to overfishing and habitat loss, some of the more localized species are threatened by the introduction of other, more widespread Oreochromis species into their ranges. This is because they—in addition to competing for the local resources—often are able to hybridize.

Taxonomy
Species in this genus, as well as those in several other oreochromine and tilapiine genera, share the common name "tilapia" and historically most were included in the genus Tilapia.

Oreochromis contains more than 30 species, and several undescribed forms exist. Judging from mtDNA sequence analysis, several clades seem to exist. Research is hampered because hybridization runs rampant in these fishes, which confounds mtDNA data (Wami tilapia is an example), and the fast speed of evolution makes choice of appropriate nuclear DNA sequences difficult. A comprehensive genetic study that included almost all the species, as well as the closely related Alcolapia, found that Oreochromis as currently defined is paraphyletic. For example, two Oreochromis species (O. amphimelas and O. esculentus) appear closer to Alcolapia than the remaining Oreochromis, and five other Oreochromis species (O. angolensis, O. lepidurus, O. niloticus, O. schwebischi and O. upembae) appear to be as distant from the "core" Oreochromis as they are from Alcolapia. A potential solution is to merge Alcolapia into Oreochromis, as done by Catalog of Fishes.

Species

The 33 recognized species in this genus are:

 Oreochromis amphimelas (Hilgendorf, 1905)
 Oreochromis andersonii (Castelnau, 1861) (three-spotted tilapia)
 Oreochromis angolensis (Trewavas, 1973)
 Oreochromis aureus (Steindachner, 1864) (blue tilapia)
 Oreochromis chungruruensis (C. G. E. Ahl, 1924)
 Oreochromis esculentus (M. Graham, 1928) (Singida tilapia)
 Oreochromis hunteri Günther, 1889 (Lake Chala tilapia)
 Oreochromis ismailiaensis Mekkawy, 1995
 Oreochromis jipe (R. H. Lowe, 1955) (Jipe tilapia)
 Oreochromis karomo (Poll, 1948) (karomo)
 Oreochromis karongae (Trewavas, 1941)
 Oreochromis korogwe (R. H. Lowe, 1955) (Korogwe tilapia)
 Oreochromis lepidurus (Boulenger, 1899)
 Oreochromis leucostictus (Trewavas, 1933)
 Oreochromis lidole (Trewavas, 1941)
 Oreochromis macrochir (Boulenger, 1912) (longfin tilapia)
 Oreochromis malagarasi Trewavas, 1983 (Malagarasi tilapia)
 Oreochromis mortimeri (Trewavas, 1966) (Kariba tilapia)
 Oreochromis mossambicus (W. K. H. Peters, 1852) (Mozambique tilapia)
 Oreochromis mweruensis Trewavas, 1983
 Oreochromis niloticus (Linnaeus, 1758) (Nile tilapia)
 Oreochromis placidus (Trewavas, 1941)
 Oreochromis placidus placidus (Trewavas, 1941) (black tilapia)
 Oreochromis placidus ruvumae (Trewavas, 1966)
 Oreochromis rukwaensis (Hilgendorf & Pappenheim, 1903) (Lake Rukwa tilapia)
 Oreochromis saka (R. H. Lowe, 1953)
 Oreochromis salinicola (Poll, 1948)
 Oreochromis schwebischi (Sauvage, 1884)
 Oreochromis shiranus Boulenger, 1897
 Oreochromis shiranus chilwae (Trewavas, 1966) (Chilwa tilapia)
 Oreochromis shiranus shiranus Boulenger, 1897
 Oreochromis spilurus (Günther, 1894)
 Oreochromis spilurus niger (Günther, 1894) (Athi River tilapia)
 Oreochromis spilurus percivali (Boulenger, 1912) (Buffalo Springs tilapia)
 Oreochromis spilurus spilurus (Günther, 1894) (Sabaki tilapia)
 Oreochromis squamipinnis (Günther, 1864)
 Oreochromis tanganicae (Günther, 1894)
 Oreochromis upembae (Thys van den Audenaerde, 1964)
 Oreochromis urolepis (Norman, 1922)
 Oreochromis urolepis hornorum (Trewavas, 1966) (Wami tilapia)
 Oreochromis urolepis urolepis (Norman, 1922) (Rufigi tilapia)
 Oreochromis variabilis (Boulenger, 1906) (Victoria tilapia)

References

 
Oreochromini
Fish of Africa
Cichlid genera
Taxa named by Albert Günther